KTM LC4 660R is a rally raid bike, produced from 2001 to 2006 with the specific task of winning the Dakar Rally, that has won five times in six participations.

Rally Dakar podium

See also
 KTM 450 Rally

References

External links
 LC4 660R at Latestbikesinfo.com

Off-road motorcycles
Motorcycles introduced in 2001
Rally raid bikes
LC4 660R